Lubuya is a genus of skinks, lizards in the family Scincidae. The genus contains one species, Lubuya ivensii, known commonly as Ivens's skink, Ivens's water skink, or the meadow skink, which is endemic to Southern Africa.

Etymology
The specific name, ivensii, is in honor of Portuguese explorer Roberto Ivens.

Geographic range
L. ivensii is found in Angola, southern Democratic Republic of Congo, and northwestern Zambia.

Reproduction
L. ivensii is viviparous.

References

Further reading
Bocage JVB du (1879). "Reptiles et batraciens nouveaux d'Angola ".  Jornal de Sciencias Mathematicas, Physicas e Naturaes, Academia Real das Sciencias de Lisboa 7: 97–99. (Euprepes ivensii, new species, pp. 97–98). (in French).
Boulenger GA (1887). Catalogue of the Lizards in the British Museum (Natural History). Second Edition. Volume III. ... Scincidæ ... London: Trustees of the British Museum (Natural History). (Taylor and Francis, printers). xii + 575 pp. + Plates I-XL. (Mabuia ivensii, p. 197).
Horton DR (1972). "A New Scincid Genus from Angola". Journal of Herpetology 6 (1): 17–20. (Lubuya, new genus; L. ivensii, new combination). 

Skinks
Lizard genera
Taxa named by David Robert Horton